Leslie Webster may refer to:

 Leslie Webster (art historian), British and female, born 1943, Anglo-Saxon specialist at the British Museum
 Leslie Webster (Australian politician), male, 1891–1975, Country Party in Victoria